Johann Janssen may refer to

Johann Voldemar Jannsen, Estonian poet
Johannes Janssen, German historian